The  is a multi-use stadium in Matsumoto, Japan. It is currently used mostly for football matches and is the home ground of Matsumoto Yamaga FC. The stadium has a capacity of 20,396 spectators. Its nickname, Alwin, is a blend of the words "Alps" (as in the Japanese Alps) and "wind".

It was formerly known as Matsumotodaira Park Stadium. Since October 2018 it has been called Sunpro Alwin for the naming rights.

References

External links

  

Football venues in Japan
Sports venues in Nagano Prefecture
Matsumoto Yamaga FC
Matsumoto, Nagano
Sports venues completed in 2001
2001 establishments in Japan